Hawaii Winter Baseball (HWB), based in Honolulu, Hawaii, was a professional baseball league in the Hawaiian islands. It was loosely affiliated with Major League Baseball (MLB).

History
The HWB league first began play in 1993. Funded by Major League Baseball, the league drew players from the MLB, Nippon Professional Baseball, the Korea Baseball Organization, and independent leagues. Games were played in Hawaii from October to December. The HWB league first folded after the 1997 season as it was too heavily reliant on its limited funding from MLB.

In 2006, the league returned for its sixth season. It was the only winter league to feature both top Japanese and American talent. However, this new league folded following the 2008 season when the contract with MLB expired.

Alumni

Source:

2006-2008 Teams

Former teams
Hilo Stars
Kauai Emeralds
Kaneohe Bay Dawgs
Kona Man O'Wars
Kona Navigators
Lahaina Whalers
Maui Stingrays

The Kaneohe Bay Dawgs and Kona Man O'Wars were announced in August 1996 as expansions teams to begin play in 1997. The Kaneohe announcement was rescinded in October 1996, and Kona did not play in 1997.

Champions
1993 Hilo Stars (No play-off)
1994 Kauai Emeralds (No play-off)
1995 Maui Stingrays
1996 Maui Stingrays
1997 Honolulu Sharks
2006 North Shore Honu
2007 North Shore Honu (Play-off rained out)
2008 Waikiki BeachBoys

References

External links
Official Website

 
Baseball in Hawaii
Defunct minor baseball leagues in the United States
Winter baseball leagues
2003 establishments in Hawaii
Sports leagues established in 1993
2008 disestablishments in Hawaii
Sports leagues disestablished in 2008
Baseball leagues in Hawaii